This name uses Portuguese naming customs. The first or maternal family name is Lopes and the second or paternal family name is Fortes.

Odaïr Júnior Lopes Fortes (born 31 March 1987) is a Cape Verdean professional footballer who plays as a winger for Régional 1 club Reims Saint-Anne and the Cape Verde national team.

Career
Fortes was born in Praia to four brothers and sisters, he immigrated to the neighbourhood of Moulin-Vert in Vitry-sur-Seine in the Paris area in 2004. His first French club was UJA Alfortville where he spent three seasons first in the Paris-Île-de-France Division d'Honneur in 2007 and then CFA2 in 2008 he moved to Stade de Reims, in his first season, he played 23 matches in Ligue 2 and the club was relegated to the National level. In the 2009–10 season, he scored two goals in the first seven matches and Reims finished 2nd and returned to Ligue 2 in the following season, the club finished second in the 2011–12 season and participated into Ligue 1.

On 13 September 2017, Fortes signed for Indian Super League franchise NorthEast United. Managing to get only two starts in the team, he remained out of touch and was on the bench for most of the season. He was released by the club in the winter transfer window.

On 29 October 2019, Reims Sainte-Anne confirmed that Fortes had joined the Régional 1 club.

International career
He represented the national team at 2015 Africa Cup of Nations.

International goals
Score and Result list Cape Verde's goal tally first

|-
| 1. || 26 March 2011 || Estádio da Várzea, Praia, Cape Verde ||  ||  ||  || 2012 Africa Cup of Nations qualification || 
|-
| 2. || 9 June 2012 || Estádio da Várzea, Praia, Cape Verde ||  ||  ||  || 2014 FIFA World Cup qualification || 
|-
| 3. || 6 September 2014 || Stade Général Seyni Kountché, Niamey, Niger ||  ||  ||  || 2015 Africa Cup of Nations qualification || 
|-
| 4. || 31 March 2015 || Estádio António Coimbra da Mota, Estoril, Portugal ||  ||  ||  || Friendly || 
|-
| 5. || 13 June 2015 || Estádio Nacional de Cabo Verde, Praia, Cape Verde ||  ||  ||  || 2017 Africa Cup of Nations qualification 
|}

References

External links
 
 
 

1987 births
Living people
People with acquired French citizenship
Sportspeople from Praia
Association football wingers
Footballers from Santiago, Cape Verde
Cape Verdean footballers
Cape Verde international footballers
Cape Verdean expatriate footballers
Ligue 2 players
Ligue 1 players
Indian Super League players
Championnat National players
Régional 1 players
UJA Maccabi Paris Métropole players
Stade de Reims players
NorthEast United FC players
EF Reims Sainte-Anne players
2013 Africa Cup of Nations players
2015 Africa Cup of Nations players
Cape Verdean expatriate sportspeople in France
Expatriate footballers in France
Expatriate footballers in India